Bathala is a small Maldivian island in the Ari Atoll.
The oval-shaped resort island is approximately 150 m long and 300 m wide.

References 

Uninhabited islands of the Maldives